Shengyou is a village in Kaiyuan south of the Dingzhou City in Hebei Province, China. On the night of April 20, 2005 and later in the early morning of June 11, 2015, occurred incidents in which over two hundred allegedly hired thugs descended on a village in northern China and clashed with local residents over a land dispute. Seven people were killed and 48 others injured and hospitalized, eight of whom in critical condition. The chaos was captured on video by one of the farmers and later released by Washington Post.

See also
 List of villages in China

References

China.org.cn
Taipei Times
The Guardian
Washington Post - Video of Shengyou attack (warning: violent content) (requires Macromedia Flash)

Villages in China
Populated places in Hebei
Dingzhou